Patrick Francis Hanran (16 September 1831 – 8 August 1916) was a member of the Queensland Legislative Assembly.

Early life
Hanran was born in Limerick, Ireland, the son of Corporal Francis Hanrahan and his wife Bridget (née Hayes). His family came to Australia in 1834 when his father was appointed  commandant of the Bowens Hollow Convict settlement and was educated at the Christian Brothers School in Sydney. On leaving school he worked at the family commission agency in Sydney before going gold mining in Victoria, New South Wales, and New Zealand. He was at Eureka during the Eureka Stockade in 1854 where, with the aid of a Catholic priest, jumped over the barricade after the fighting had ceased to pass back bodies of the dead and dying protesters. In 1866 he was a storekeeper in Townsville but was declared insolvent in 1875.

Public career
Hanran was an alderman on the Townsville City Council for 27 years, from around 1868 until 1895. He was mayor of Townsville on seven occasions - 1871-1872, 1876-1877, 1879, 1882, 1892, 1893 and 1896. At the 1899 Queensland colonial election he joined his Ministerial colleague, Robert Philp as the member for Townsville, defeating the Labour pairing of Anthony Ogden and Thomas Foley and the at the time Independent politician, William Lennon. He went on to hold the seat until 1909 when he retired from politics.

Personal life
On 17 September 1864 he married Mary Anne Ogle in Townsville and together had two sons and five daughters. Hanran died in August 1916 and his funeral proceeded from his former residence at Melton Hill to the West End Cemetery.

References

Members of the Queensland Legislative Assembly
1831 births
1916 deaths
Mayors of Townsville